is a village located in Miyako District, Okinawa Prefecture, Japan. The village consists of Tarama Island and Minna Island between Ishigaki Island and Miyako Island.

, the village has a population of 1,276 residents and 543 households.

History

Under the Ryukyu Kingdom, Tarama is said to have been used as a penal colony for political prisoners.

In 1879, with the abolition of the han system and creation of the prefectures of Japan, Tarama became part of the newly formed Okinawa Prefecture. In 1896 the village became part of Miyaki District. In 1908, with the abolishment of the magiri system in Okinawa, the three districts of present-day village, Nakasuzu, Shiyugaa, and Minna, became part of the village of Hirara. They were separated from Hirara in 1913 as part of a further redistricting of Okinawa, and incorporated as the Village of Tarama.

The village hall of Tarama was the first modern tiled structured to be built on the islands, and the first village council consisted of eight citizens. Residents of Minna completed a planned relocation to the Takano district of Hirara in 1961.

Tarama was electrified and received direct telephone service in 1964, and residents were supplied with power for five hours a day. This increased to 17 hours a day by 1969, and the village was fully electrified in 1972. Regular ferry service to the village began in the same period, and Tarama Airport was opened in December 1971.

Geography

The two islands of the village, Tarama and Minna, are located at the midpoint between Ishigaki Island and Miyako Island. The islands face the Pacific Ocean to the south and the East China Sea to the north. The two islands have historically suffered from typhoon damage and drought.

Climate

Demographics

Tarama has seen population decline since the beginning of the 20th century. In the period prior to World War II typhoon damage and drought caused many residents to leave the island, mostly to Osaka and areas of the newly formed Japanese Empire. Residents of Tarama emigrated to Taiwan, the South Pacific, Korea, and Manchuria in this period. Residents of Minna completed a planned relocation to the Takano district of Hirara in 1961. At present the population of Minna Island has only one household and two people.

Education

The Village of Tarama has one preschool, one elementary school, and one junior high school, all named Tarama.
 Tarama Junior High School (多良間中学校)
 Tarama Elementary School (多良間小学校)
 Tarama Kindergarten (多良間幼稚園)

The preschool and Tarama Elementary school are connected, and located directly south of the village hall at the north of the island. Minna, due to its depopulation, no longer has any educational institutions. The village has no high school; students must leave the island to attend high schools in other areas of Okinawa Prefecture.

Transportation

Tarama Airport serves the island.

References

External links

Tarama official website 

 
Villages in Okinawa Prefecture
Populated coastal places in Japan